William Hunt Block (born April 2, 1954) is an American film producer who has been CEO of Miramax since April 2017. His producing credits include W. (2008), District 9 (2009), Fury (2014), Bad Moms (2016), Dirty Grandpa (2016), Halloween (2018), and Halloween Kills (2021).

Early life
Block was born in New York City, where he attended Columbia University and later became a supporter of the school's film program.

Career

Block began his career as a literary agent before founding the Intertalent Agency in 1988, where he represented artists such as Kim Basinger, Samuel L. Jackson, Steven Seagal, Charlie Sheen, John Travolta, Forest Whitaker, Sam Raimi, Roland Emmerich and William Friedkin. In 1992, he joined International Creative Management as head of West Coast Operations.

Block founded Artisan Entertainment, an independent film studio that produced films including The Blair Witch Project; The Buena Vista Social Club; Darren Aronofsky's Pi and Requiem for a Dream; The Limey directed by Steven Soderbergh; The Ninth Gate starring Johnny Depp and directed by Roman Polanski; and David Koepp's Stir of Echoes and Made starring Jon Favreau and Vince Vaughn.

In 2002, Block founded film finance, production and sales company QED International. He was CEO of QED for 12 years, producing films including Neill Blomkamp's District 9 and Elysium, Oliver Stone's W. and David Ayer's WWII thriller Fury starring Brad Pitt. In 2014, after Media Content Capital took a controlling interest in QED, Block left the company to launch Merced Media with producer Kevin Frakes.

From 2015–17, he was managing director of Bill Block Media, producing the commercially successful Bad Moms starring Mila Kunis and Kristen Bell, and Dirty Grandpa starring Robert De Niro and Zac Efron. In November 2015, he settled a legal dispute with QED, after his former company filed a federal lawsuit alleging trademark infringement and unfair competition concerning the rights to Dirty Grandpa.

He was named CEO of Miramax in April 2017.

Personal life
Block lives in the Hollywood Hills with his wife, Eugenia Kuzmina, a model, actress and comedian, his two sons and a daughter.

Filmography
He was a producer in all films unless otherwise noted.

Film

Production manager

Thanks

Television

References

External links

Living people
1954 births
People from New York City
Columbia University alumni
Film producers from New York (state)
American talent agents
American chief executives
Paramount Global people
Miramax people
American film studio executives